James A. Hall, Sr. (born 1939) is an American percussionist, jazz drummer, jazz guitarist, music educator, and Distinguished Professor Emeritus at the University of South Carolina School of Music.

Selected discography
 The Dick Goodwin Jazz Quintet, Columbia, South Carolina: Dick Goodwin Musics (1978) 
 Faculty Sextet, University of South Carolina, Columbia, SC School of Music (1989) 
 Dick Goodwin Quintet, Studio Time, Columbia, South Carolina 
 The Dick Goodwin Big Band, Studio Time 2, Columbia, South Carolina (2006) 
 Pete Neighbour, It's Alright With Me, Columbia, South Carolina: Pete Neighbour (E)(No #2) . Recorded in Columbia, South Carolina, January–May 2009

References

External links
 Jim Hall bio at the Jazz Guitar Summit

University of North Texas College of Music alumni
Living people
1947 births
American male guitarists
20th-century American guitarists
20th-century American male musicians
American male jazz musicians